Nanfu Railway may refer to:
Nanchuan–Fuling Railway, a railway in Chongqing under construction since 2008
Nanping–Fuzhou Railway, a railway in Fujian built in 1959